The Monument to Vladimir the Great 
is a 17.5-metre-high monument to Vladimir the Great, located in Borovitskaya Square in central Moscow. It was designed by the designer Salavat Scherbakov on the initiative of the Russian Military Historical Society and the city government. The opening ceremony was held on 4 November 2016.

The Monument to Vladimir the Great is considerably larger than the monuments to Patriarch Hermogenes and Alexander I, which are located nearby, in Alexandrovsky garden. But it is, for example, considerably inferior to the monument "In honour of the 300th anniversary of the Russian fleet", whose height is 98 metres.

During polemics, there were fears that its erection, along with other construction work in the protection zone of the Moscow Kremlin and on its territory, puts the Kremlin under danger of being removed from the UNESCO World Heritage List, but as the Minister of Culture later stated, the reports on the erection of the monument, sent to UNESCO, fully satisfied the organization.

Gallery

See also 
 Saint Vladimir Monument in Kyiv
 Statue of Saint Volodymyr, London

References 

Cultural depictions of Vladimir the Great
Monuments and memorials in Moscow
Buildings and structures completed in 2016